is a Japanese teenage boy's romance manga written and illustrated by Kenjiro Kawatsu that was serialized in Weekly Shōnen Champion from 2002 to 2004. 

No Bra tells the story of Masato Kataoka, a somewhat dimwitted high school student, whose childhood friend Yuki Nomura moves in with him one day. Because of Yuki's cute face, girlish clothing, and apparent feminine features, Masato is extremely happy with his new life—until Yuki's mother calls Masato, and tells him that Yuki is a boy shortly after. The story initially revolves around Masato's relationship with Yuki and his slowly disintegrating reluctance to develop romantic feelings for her. It later began to focus heavily on other characters' acceptance of Yuki's identity as a woman and her shift in identity from crossdresser to trans woman.

Synopsis

Years before the start of No Bra, Masato Kataoka and Yuki Nomura were childhood friends, though they were later separated—with Masato soon forgetting anything about the friendship and Yuki still treasuring those memories. Masato grows to become a high school student enrolled in Meikyuu Private Academy, whereas Yuki moves from school to school, never quite fitting in because of her crossdressing and feminine appearance. One day, Yuki moves in with Masato and starts going to school with him. Yuki promptly becomes one of the most popular girls in the class, alongside Kaoru Oozora, whom Masato nurses a crush on. Meanwhile, Yuki continues to refuse all of Masato's pleas for her to act more manly, forcing Masato to stop any idea that Yuki and Masato live together, while also juggling his feelings for Yuki and Kaoru. Masato becomes confused about which girl he should pick.

Characters

 
 Masato Kataoka is a freshman in Meikyuu Private Academy who lives by himself in Tokyo. He always wears Hawaiian shirts and is best friends with Hideki Nogami. Masato is often one to blend with the background, although he does stand up to what he deems unjust from time to time. Masato constantly daydreams about the opposite sex (or about Yuki with a female body), but also becomes confused when he sees Yuki as attractive, since she is biologically male. Masato and Yuki were also childhood friends, but Masato does not remember anything from that time period, much to Yuki's chagrin.
He appeared short with Kaoru in Kawatsu's other manga Koibana Onsen.

 
 Yuki is Masato's childhood friend, though unlike Masato, Yuki remembers and treasures the long-ago friendship and commonly refers to Masato as "Maa-kun" because Yuki remembers calling her childhood friend by that. Ever since Yuki and Masato parted ways in their childhood, Yuki has been growing out her hair; until Masato finally convinces her to cut it short, Yuki obliges because it represents a "memento of [their] meeting again". Yuki is also a crossdresser, and this combined with her naturally feminine features causes everybody except Masato to believe Yuki is a girl; Masato's attempts to convince people otherwise usually result in them belittling Masato and insulting him. Therefore, Yuki is extremely popular with the rest of the boys in her class, although Yuki states the only person she loves is "Maa-kun". Her family is firmly aware that she is a "crossdresser", yet in later chapters, it is implied and acknowledged by most characters and Yuki that she has "the heart of a girl and the body of a boy" and lately accepted as transgender rather than a cross-dresser.

 
 Hideki is Masato's best friend. He is completely unaware that Yuki is a trans woman, and as such is constantly determined to make Masato fall in love with Yuki. Hideki is also very overweight, though he uses this trait to his advantage—at one point using his massive body as a human shield for Masato to carry away a drunken Yuki from would-be male admirers. Hideki is also nicknamed "Hidepon" in the manga.

 
 Kaoru is the most popular girl in Masato's class, having both athleticism and excellent grades. Masato is enamored with her, although he constantly berates himself for being too out of her league. However, Masato has helped Kaoru on many occasions—some of which Masato does not even remember—and this causes Kaoru to harbor some secret feelings for Masato. Noticing this, Hideki becomes angry on Yuki's behalf, and often tries to keep the two apart. She is jealous over Nomura (sensing Yuki affection for him) and Miss Mizutani (misunderstanding her real intentions towards Masato). In chapter 18, it turns out "Maa-kun" is actually Kaoru. She was 'Masato Kaoru' until her mother remarried and changed her name from 'Masato' to 'Oozura'.
She appeared short with Masato in Kawatsu's other manga Koibana Onsen.

 
 Mariko, also known as "Miss Mizutani" (水谷先生 Mizutani-sensei), is Masato, Yuki, Hideki, and Kaoru's homeroom teacher. She becomes suspicious when she discovers that Yuki and Masato have the same home address and lives together. She's quick to take advantage of their situation in order to keep herself from being fired and so she can pay her overdue loans, saying she doesn't have to pay rent while living with them. Mizutani is a rude, freeloading, alcoholic. Extremely irresponsible, she unwittingly allows Yuki drink with her and spends all of her wages on expensive goods instead of paying off her loans. Caring only for her own well being and comfort, goes to extreme lengths to make her life easier even at the expense Masato. She later offers Masato sexual experiences to continue living in his home.

Chapter list

References

External links

Manga News review (French)
Le triangle amoureux (French)

2002 manga
Akita Shoten manga
Comedy anime and manga
Romance anime and manga
Shōnen manga
Transgender in anime and manga
Transgender-related comics